Paul Ecke Ranch is an American florist. Located in Encinitas, California, with production facilities in Guatemala, Ecke has grown to become the world's largest poinsettia (christmas star) producer with 50% market share.

German emigrant Albert Ecke began cultivating poinsettias in Eagle Rock, Los Angeles in 1909. Paul Ecke Jr. took over the family business in 1963 and expanded it heavily. Paul Ecke III took over Ecke Ranch in 1992 and started the business in Guatemala. In 2012 he sold the company. In 2015 it was taken over by Dümmen Orange. Over the years, Ecke donated substantial money to the Encinitas Union School District. He also donated 92 acres of property to the North Coast Family YMCA, Quail Botanical Gardens and the California Department of Parks and Recreation for a beach park in Carlsbad.

References

Horticultural companies of the United States